Krešimir is a Croatian given name. It may refer to:

Krešimir Ćosić (1948–1995), Croatian professional basketball player, member of FIBA Hall of Fame and Basketball Hall of Fame
Krešimir Ćosić (politician) (born 1949), Croatian soldier and politician
Krešimir Čač (born 1976), Croatian butterfly and medley swimmer
Krešimir Crnković (born 1995), Croatian biathlete and cross country skier
Krešimir Čuljak (born 1970), Croatian rower, won a bronze medal in the eights competition at the 2000 Summer Olympics
Krešimir Baranović (1894–1975), Yugoslav composer and conductor
Krešimir Bubalo (born 1973), Croatian politician of the HDSSB party, and Mayor of Osijek, his home city
Krešimir I of Croatia, King of Croatian Kingdom from 935 until his death in 945
Krešimir III of Croatia (died 1030), King of Croatia in 1000–1030 from the House of Trpimirović and founder of its cadet line House of Krešimirović
Krešimir Kordić (born 1981), Bosnian football player, currently playing for ŠK Slovan Bratislava
Krešimir Lončar (born 1983), Croatian professional basketball player
Krešimir Makarin (born 1987), Croatian football player currently playing for Hajduk Split as a forward or a winger
Krešimir Marušić (born 1969), Australian football player
Krešimir Mišak (born 1972), Croatian journalist, rock musician and science fiction author
Krešimir Stanić (born 1985), Swiss footballer of Croatian descent
Krešimir Zubak (born 1947), Bosnian Croat politician
Michael Krešimir II of Croatia (died 969), King of Croatia from 949 to his death in 969
Peter Krešimir IV of Croatia (died 1075), King of Croatia from 1059 to his death

References

Croatian masculine given names